Felipe R. Solís Olguín (18 December 1944 – 23 April 2009) was a Mexican archaeologist, anthropologist, and historian as well as curator and Director of the National Anthropology Museum from 2000 until his death on April 23, 2009.

Solís became a professor at the Postgraduate Mesoamerican Studies program at the Philosophy and Literature Faculty of the National Autonomous University of Mexico in 1997 and served on Academic Council of the program from 1998. He also taught at the National School of Professional Studies in Acatlan and at the National School of Anthropology and History and the National School of Restoration, Conservation and Museography. Solís was a guest lecturer at the Universidad de Extremadura in Spain and at the Universidad de Rancagua in Chile.

Initial reports of his death by some media outlets speculated that Solís Olguín had possibly been a victim of swine flu. However authorities revealed that the cause of death was complications from a pre-existing cardiac condition, unrelated to swine flu.  He had escorted U.S. President Barack Obama on a tour of the museum a week before his death.

Publications
During his career, he published almost 200 articles and authored or co-authored about 30 books.

Representative books
Human Body, Human Spirit: A Portrait of Ancient Mexico, 1993
One Hundred Masterpieces of Mexican Art: The Pre-Hispanic Period, 1998
Olmec Art of Ancient Mexico, 1998
National Museum of Anthropology, 1999
Los senorios de la costa del Golfo, 2000
Tepeyac : estudios historicos, 2000
El Museo Nacional en el imaginario mexicano, 2001
Aztecs, 2002
Art Treasures of Ancient Mexico:Journey to the Land of the Gods, 2002
Hernán Cortés y la conquista de México, 2003
The Aztec Empire, 2004
Mexica: National Museum of Anthropology, Mexico, 2004
The Aztec Calendar and Other Solar Monuments, 2004
Cholula: The Great Pyramid, 2006
Mexica : bosquejos de la vida del pueblo, 2008

Notes

Mexican archaeologists
Mexican anthropologists
Mexican Mesoamericanists
Mesoamerican archaeologists
Aztec scholars
20th-century Mesoamericanists
21st-century Mesoamericanists
1944 births
2009 deaths
20th-century archaeologists
20th-century anthropologists